Ingrid Falk may refer to:
 Ingrid Falk (artist) (born 1960), Swedish painter and installation artist
 Ingrid Falk (rower), German rower